Petrie Airfield was a World War II military airfield located just to the south of the North Pine River in what is now Lawnton, Queensland, Australia. After the war, the airfield was dismantled and the area is now part of the urban area of Petrie-Strathpine.

History
The Petrie Airfield gets its name from its location in the Petrie region, in turn named after Thomas Petrie who established his homestead Murrumba on the North Pine River In 1858.

World War II
 RAAF units based at Petrie Airfield
 83 Squadron (Boomerang)
 12 Squadron (Vengeance)
 RAF units based at Petrie Airfield
 No. 549 Squadron RAF (Spitfire) Lawnton/ Strathpine December 1943 – July 1944
 No. 548 Squadron RAF (Spitfire) Lawnton/ Strathpine December 1943 – July 1944
 USAAF based at Petrie Airfield
 80th Fighter Squadron (8th Fighter Group), 10 May – 20 July 1942, P-39, P-400 Airacobra
 Dispersed from 8th Fighter Group HQ at Eagle Farm Airport.

See also
 United States Army Air Forces in Australia (World War II)
 List of airports in Queensland

References

 
 Maurer, Maurer (1983). Air Force Combat Units of World War II. Maxwell AFB, Alabama: Office of Air Force History. .
 Pacific Wrecks-Petrie Airfield
 RAAF Landing Ground Map - Petrie Airfield

Airfields of the United States Army Air Forces in Australia
Defunct airports in Queensland
Queensland in World War II